La Vache is a cave in located in the Northern Range, on the north coast of Trinidad. The Caves are home to the Oilbirds, These are the only nocturnal fruit eating birds in the world. They forage at night, navigating by echolocation in the same way as bats.

Natural history of Trinidad and Tobago
Caves of Trinidad and Tobago
Caves of the Caribbean